Solomon Olamilekan Adeola   also known by the alias Yayi (born 10 August 1969), is a Nigerian politician serving as the Senator from Lagos West. From 2011 to 2015, he was the Chairman of House of Representatives Committee on Public Accounts. He is also a chartered accountant, and a member of the Association of Accounting Technicians (AAT).

Early life and education 

Adeola was born on 10 August 1969, at Lagos Island Maternity Hospital to Ayinde Adeola Ogunleye and Abeeni Olasunbo Ogunleye (née Akinola). He grew up in Alimosho where he began his education at State Primary School in Alimosho, Lagos. He proceeded to Community Grammar School, Akowonjo, Lagos for his secondary education. He then moved on to the Ondo State Polytechnic, Owo now Rufus Giwa Polytechnic, Owo, Ondo state where he bagged a Higher National Diploma (HND) in Accounting.

Adeola is a Chartered Accountant and is a Chartered Accountant-Associate at the Institute of Chartered Accountants of Nigeria (ICAN).

Professional background 

Adeola had a stint with the flagship of Nigerian newspapers, The Guardian Newspapers Limited for 12 years and rose to the position of Accountant.

Adeola proceeded to Olatunji Omoyeni & Co, a chartered accounting firm, where he led the audit team for several years and was later promoted to the position of a Senior Auditor. He later established his own company, SOOTEM Nigeria Limited, where he was the managing director and chief executive officer in the firm that specialized in tax consultancy.

Political career 

Following his decision to join active politics, sometime at the dawn of the 4th Republic, Adeola was nominated and won the primary of the then ruling Action Congress of Nigeria (Lagos State) and was elected as a member to represent Alimosho State Constituency 2, at the Lagos State House of Assembly from 2003 to 2007, and again from 2007 to 2011. Adeola was reputed to have been instrumental to the enactment of the law that strengthened the Lagos State Internal Revenue Service, a legislation that catapulted the revenue of the state from N5 billion monthly to over N20 billion. He was also part of the team that passed the Fiscal Responsibility Act and the Public Procurement Act of Lagos State.

Adeola was elected to the Federal Legislature to represent Alimosho Federal Constituency at the Nigerian House of Representatives in 2011.

And when the committees of the House were inaugurated by the Speaker, Rt. Hon. Aminu Tambuwal for members, he got position of the chairman of the only constitutional committee, the Public Accounts Committee of the House. He got the post as a first time member of the House. He is now a Senator and is the Vice Chairman of Senate Committee on Communications as well as member of the Finance, Marine, Interior and Science and Technology committees of the Senate.
He was re-elected as senator representing Lagos west in the 2019 general elections.

Membership 

Adeola is a member of Aids, Loans and Debt Management, Emergency & Disaster Preparedness, Land Transport and Petroleum Resources (Up Stream) Committees.

Award 
In October 2022, a Nigerian national honour of Commander Of The Order Of The Niger (CON) was conferred on him by President Muhammadu Buhari.

References 

1969 births
Living people
Yoruba politicians
Rufus Giwa Polytechnic alumni
Nigerian accountants
People from Lagos
Politicians from Lagos
Members of the Senate (Nigeria)
Lagos State politicians
Politicians from Ogun State
Residents of Lagos